Colorado's 6th congressional district is a congressional district in the U.S. state of Colorado. Located in central Colorado, the district encompasses much of the eastern part of the Denver metropolitan area, including all of Aurora, as well as portions of the southern (Centennial and Littleton) and northern metro area (Brighton and Henderson).

The district is currently represented by Democrat Jason Crow.

The district was created in 1983 as a result of the redistricting cycle after the 1980 Census, and was originally a classic suburban Republican bastion; this was once the safest seat for Colorado Republicans outside of Colorado Springs. However, changing demographics in the Front Range, especially in Arapahoe County which went from a traditional conservative suburban/exurban stronghold to a densely populated, ethnically and culturally diverse Democratic-leaning inner suburban county, has made suburban Denver much friendlier to Democrats. The 2010 redistricting shifted the more rural, GOP-dominated sections of the district to the nearby 4th and added heavily populated and Democratic parts of Aurora, turning the 6th district into a Democratic-leaning swing district. However, Republicans are still competitive downballot, and the Democratic strength was limited to western Arapahoe County for much of its history, as the components of Douglas County and Adams County in the 6th were still Republican leaning: this changed in 2020, as Joe Biden and Representative Jason Crow won all county areas in the district.

After the 2020 redistricting, the 6th will become a purely inner suburban district anchored in western Arapahoe County, however small parts of Jefferson, Douglas, and Adams Counties will be included  as well to completely take in the cities of Littleton and Aurora.

History

1990s
Following the 1990 U.S. Census and associated realignment of Colorado congressional districts, the 6th Congressional district consisted of portions of Arapahoe and Jefferson counties.

2000s
Following the 2000 U.S. Census and associated realignment of Colorado congressional districts, the 6th Congressional district consisted of Douglas and Elbert counties as well as portions of Arapahoe, Jefferson, and Park counties.

2010s

During the 2010 Colorado Redistricting, the 6th Congressional district lost most of its previous area; the district now consisted of the western portions of Arapahoe and Adams counties plus the community of Highlands Ranch in Douglas County and a very little part of Jefferson County.

2020s

During the 2020 Colorado Redistricting, the 6th Congressional district became a pure inner-suburban district consisting of western Arapahoe County, the portions of the City of Aurora located in Adams and Douglas counties, as well as parts of Jefferson County bordering Littleton near Highway 470.

Characteristics
Suburban in character, this ethnically and economically diverse district takes in Denver's southern and eastern suburbs and is now fairly Democratic, despite historically being a Republican district.

Aurora, a diverse city with 21% foreign-born residents  makes up the base of the population: while the city generally votes to the left and is a suburban stronghold for Colorado Democrats, it also provided enough support for Republican Mike Coffman to hold the district for a decade.

The suburbs to Denver's south side in the district are a mixed bag - Greenwood Village and Cherry Hills Village have a large amount of registered Republicans, however the Republicans here are mainly economically conservative and much more moderate socially compared to the rest of the state. Centennial and Littleton tend to be swing cities due to a demographic mix - while southern Littleton and eastern Centennial tend to be highly wealthy and lean slightly Republican, northern Littleton and western/central Centennial have a large lower to middle-class population that leans Democratic. Englewood and Sheridan, being closer socially and economically to nearby Denver are safe for the Democrats, however they do not make up a large part of the district's population.

Voting
Election results from presidential races

List of members representing the district

Election results

1982

1983 (Special)

1984

1986

1988

1990

1992

1994

1996

1998

2000

2002

2004

2006

2008

Republican primary

General election

2010

2012

2014

2016

2018

2020

2022

Historical district boundaries

See also

Colorado's congressional districts
List of United States congressional districts

References
 Congressional Biographical Directory of the United States 1774–present

6
Douglas County, Colorado
Elbert County, Colorado
Arapahoe County, Colorado
Jefferson County, Colorado
Park County, Colorado
1983 establishments in Colorado